Leonard Brody is a Canadian venture capitalist, author and media commentator. He has helped in raising money for startup companies, been through a number of internet IPOs and has been involved in the building, financing and/or sale of more than five companies to date.

In 2004, Brody co-founded, and was CEO of, NowPublic, a citizen journalism online news source. In 2007, the company was named by Time Magazine as one of the top 50 websites in the world, was inducted into the Newseum in Washington and was recently acquired by the Anschutz Corporation. Currently he sits as the President of the Clarity Digital Group  responsible for overseeing one of the largest online news conglomerates in the world including Examiner.com and NowPublic, which between them, share over 30 million unique visitors a month and over 300,000 contributors.

Brody was the Senior Technology Advisor to the Canadian Minister of Foreign Affairs & International Trade. Currently, he is one of the co-founders of GrowLab, a Vancouver & San Francisco based accelerator.

His work has been featured in such publications as Fortune, the Wall Street Journal, the BBC and the New York Times . He is co-author of the best selling books, "Innovation Nation: Canadian Leadership from Jurassic Park to Java" and "Everything I Needed to Know About Business...I Learned from a Canadian" both published by John Wiley & Sons.

Brody holds an Honours Bachelor of Arts from Queen's University, a law degree from Osgoode Hall and is a graduate of the Private Equity Course at the Harvard Business School. 

Brody owns a stake in Coventry City Football Club in the UK and until November 2011 served on the board.

Bibliography
 Innovation Nation: Canadian Leadership from Jurassic Park to Java.  (with Ken Grant, Matt Holland (writer) - Toronto: Wiley, 2002.
 Everything I Needed to Know About Business...I learned from a Canadian. Toronto: Wiley, 2005.  (with David Raffa)

References

Living people
Canadian businesspeople
Canadian economics writers
Canadian finance and investment writers
Year of birth missing (living people)